The 2016 SEC softball tournament was at Nusz Park on the campus of Mississippi State University in Starkville, Mississippi from May 11 through May 15, 2016. The tournament awarded the Southeastern Conference's automatic bid to the 2016 NCAA Division I softball tournament to the Auburn Tigers. The Championship game between Auburn and LSU was broadcast on ESPN and the semifinals were broadcast on ESPNU, while all other SEC tournament games were broadcast live on the SEC Network.

In addition to the TV broadcast, every game will be available to listen to online and through select radio stations via the SEC Radio Network.

Tournament

  Only the top 12 teams are able to play, therefore, Arkansas could not play in the tournament.
  Vanderbilt does not sponsor a softball team.
All times listed are Central Daylight Time.
  Due to rain. 4 Auburn vs 5 Alabama was delayed to 11 AM on May 13.

Schedule

References

SEC softball tournament
tournament